The 2014 Major League Lacrosse season was the 14th season of the league.  The season began on April 26, 2014 and concluded on August 23, 2014 with the Denver Outlaws beating the Rochester Rattlers to win the franchise's first Steinfeld Cup.

Milestones and events
January 10, 2014- The Collegiate Draft took place in Philadelphia, Pennsylvania (in conjunction with the 2014 US Lacrosse National Convention). Midfielder Tom Schreiber was the first overall selection by the Ohio Machine

Coaching changes
On November 21, 2013, Major League Lacrosse announced that Denver Outlaws assistant Stan Ross would head the newly formed Florida Launch.

Standings

All Star Game 

Team USA defeated Team MLL 10–9 in the 2014 MLL All Star Game.

Playoffs
For only the second time and first time since 2002 the MLL playoffs were held over two weeks instead of one weekend. the semifinals were held in Denver and Rochester and the championship game in Kennesaw, Georgia.

Annual awards

All-Pro team

Defensive Team:
 G John Galloway, Rochester Rattlers
 D Tucker Durkin, Florida Launch
 D Michael Manley, Rochester Rattlers
 D Joel White, Rochester Rattlers
 D Lee Zink, Denver Outlaws

Offensive Team:
 M Peter Baum, Boston Cannons
 M Greg Gurenlian, New York Lizards
 M Paul Rabil, Boston Cannons
 M Jeremy Sieverts, Denver Outlaws
 A John Grant Jr., Denver Outlaws
 A Rob Pannell, New York Lizards
 A Casey Powell, Florida Launch

References

External links
 Official Site

14
Major League Lacrosse